Edinson Roberto Cavani Gómez (born 14 February 1987) is a Uruguayan professional footballer who plays as a striker for La Liga club Valencia and the Uruguay national team. Nicknamed El Matador ('The Bullfighter') and known for his intelligent movement off the ball, clinical finishing, and heading ability, Cavani is widely regarded as one of the best strikers of his generation and as one of Uruguay's greatest ever players.

Cavani began his career playing for Danubio in Montevideo, where he played for two years, before moving to Italian side Palermo in 2007. In 2010, Cavani signed for Napoli, who signed him on an initial loan deal before buying him for a total fee of €17 million. He helped them win the Coppa Italia in 2012 and established himself as the most dominant striker in Serie A. In mid-2013, Cavani joined Paris Saint-Germain in France for a reported €64 million, at the time the most expensive signing in French football history. With PSG, Cavani won six Ligue 1 titles, five Coupes de la Ligue and four Coupes de France. He also ranks as the club's second all-time top goalscorer. In 2020, Cavani signed with Manchester United, scoring 17 goals in his first season, including a goal in the UEFA Europa League final, before signing for Valencia in 2022.

Cavani scored on his Uruguay debut against Colombia in 2008, and has since then earned 136 caps and scored 58 international goals, only behind strike partner Luis Suárez among Uruguayan internationals. He has participated in ten major international tournaments: four FIFA World Cups (2010, 2014, 2018 and 2022), five Copas América (2011, 2015, 2016, 2019 and 2021), and one FIFA Confederations Cup (2013). Cavani scored at the 2010 World Cup to help Uruguay to fourth place in the tournament, and in 2011 was part of the Uruguay squad that won a record fifteenth Copa América title. He finished as the CONMEBOL 2018 World Cup qualification top scorer with ten goals.

During his time in Serie A, Cavani was named in the Serie A Team of the Year three times and was Serie A top scorer in the 2012–13 season. During his time in Ligue 1, he was named in the UNFP Ligue 1 Team of the Year three times, was awarded Ligue 1 Player of the Year for the 2016–17 season, and was the league's top scorer in the 2016–17 and 2017–18 seasons. He was awarded the Golden Foot in 2018 for his achievements in football.

Club career

Palermo

After his breakthrough at the 2007 South American Youth Championship, several big teams were reportedly interested in signing Cavani, including Juventus and Milan. On 29 January 2007, however, Palermo chairman Maurizio Zamparini announced the signing of the promising Uruguayan. The bid was officially confirmed on 31 January for €4.475 million. Cavani made his debut on 11 March 2007 in a home league match against Fiorentina, coming on in the 55th minute with his team 1–0 down and scoring an impressive equaliser only 15 minutes later, a goal reminiscent of Marco van Basten's strike in the 1988 UEFA European Football Championship final. In his second season with the Rosanero, Cavani found himself fighting for a first team place with Fabrizio Miccoli and Amauri.

After Amauri's departure to Juventus in June 2008, Cavani cemented his place in the starting line-up, forming a striking partnership with Fabrizio Miccoli and scoring a total 14 goals in the 2008–09 season, earning the nickname "El Matador" due to his composure in front of goal. He retained his place for the 2009–10 season under new boss Walter Zenga, and also under successor Delio Rossi, being instrumental in the team's successful run in Serie A which took Palermo to European qualification and potential qualification to the UEFA Champions League with two games remaining. In April 2010, he signed a new contract with Palermo valid to June 2014.

Napoli

2010–11: Move to Europe
In July 2010, Cavani signed for Napoli. The transfer, however, was a loan of €5 million plus an option/obligation to buy outright for €12 million, which made the total fee €17 million. After debuting for Napoli as a substitute in the previous game, Cavani scored twice in his first start, as Napoli beat Elfsborg in the UEFA Europa League 2–0 and qualified for the main tournament. He then started his Serie A tenure with Napoli scoring a controversial goal against Fiorentina after just seven minutes, with replays showing the ball landing on the line. Cavani also scored on his home debut against Bari before adding a late winner against Sampdoria, meaning he had scored in his first four competitive matches with Napoli.

On 26 September, Cavani came on as a late replacement with 30 minutes left in a game against Cesena which Napoli was losing 1–0. After assisting the equalising goal, he went on to score two more, with the scoreline finishing at 4–1. That meant Cavani shared the lead as top scorer in the league alongside Internazionale's Samuel Eto'o. Cavani's partnership with fellow forwards Ezequiel Lavezzi and Marek Hamšík led the Italian sporting media to dub them "The Three Tenors" after the famous singing group of the same name. On 15 December, Cavani netted a 92nd-minute goal against Steaua București to help his team to a 1–0 win and progress beyond the group stage of the Europa League. In the first match, which was held on Romanian soil, he had scored an equalising goal in the 97th minute. On 9 January 2011, Cavani scored a hat-trick during a 3–0 win over Juventus, the third goal coming by way of a diving header. On 30 January, Cavani scored another hat-trick, this time in a 4–0 win over Sampdoria. Cavani continued his fine form scoring a brace against Roma, with Napoli winning 2–0.

On 20 March, Cavani scored another brace against Cagliari in a 2–1 win. This win kept them within three points of leaders Milan with eight games left. On 3 April, Cavani scored yet another hat-trick in a 4–3 comeback win over Lazio, having been 2–0 and 3–2 down during the game. He also became the highest league goalscorer in a single season in Napoli's history, netting 25 goals in Serie A. On 8 May, in a 2–1 away loss against Lecce, he received a red card for two bookable offences. He sarcastically applauded the referee after the decision and was handed a two-match ban for the action. As Napoli only had two more games of the season, it meant that his season was over and that he would not be able to regain his top position in the Serie A scoring charts, as Antonio Di Natale had surpassed him with 26 goals. Cavani signed a new five-year contract on 19 May, keeping him at Napoli until 2016.

2011–12: Coppa Italia win
On 14 September, Cavani scored the opener in Napoli's first game of their Champions League campaign, a 1–1 away draw at Manchester City. Four days later, on 18 September, he scored a hat-trick against Milan in Napoli's 3–1 home win. On 22 November, Cavani scored both goals in the match winning brace 2–1 at home against Manchester City in the Champions League, leaving Napoli in pole position to follow Bayern Munich into the knockout stage. On 26 November, Cavani scored a 94th-minute equaliser against Atalanta after Napoli went a goal down in the 64th minute through on-loan Napoli striker Germán Denis. On 21 December, Cavani netted a brace in Napoli's 6–1 thrashing of Genoa, helping the Azzurri finish 2011 strong and end the first half of the season in sixth place.

On 17 February 2012, Cavani scored two goals against Fiorentina, helping Napoli go in fifth place ahead of Internazionale. On 21 February, Cavani scored the second goal against Chelsea in the Champions League round of 16 first leg in Naples. He also provided the assists for both of Ezequiel Lavezzi's goals that game. Napoli subsequently went on to win this game 3–1. Following Napoli's exit from the Champions League at the hands of Chelsea, Cavani scored two goals against Udinese in the last ten minutes to earn a much-needed draw to keep Napoli in the hunt for the last Champions League qualifying spot. A few days later, he converted a fantastic counter-attack against Siena to book Napoli a place in the Coppa Italia final. On 21 April, he celebrated his 200th career league appearance by scoring in a 2–0 win against Novara. Cavani finished the league season with 23 goals, tied for third on the goal scoring charts with Udinese striker Antonio Di Natale. On 20 May, Cavani scored a penalty against Juventus in the 2012 Coppa Italia final at the Stadio Olimpico, Rome, which Napoli won 2–0. Cavani finished the tournament as the top goalscorer, with five goals.

2012–13: Serie A top scorer

Cavani's first goal of the Serie A season came on 26 August, netting the final goal of Napoli's 3–0 defeat of former club Palermo. A month later, on 26 September, Cavani scored a mesmerising hat-trick against Lazio to maintain Napoli's undefeated start to the Serie A season in a 3–0 win.

On 8 November, Cavani scored all four goals, including a half-volley from outside the box and a tremendous free kick, as Napoli came back from 2–1 down to defeat Dnipro Dnipropetrovsk 4–2 in the group stage of the Europa League. Cavani scored a late penalty in the 94th minute to secure a 2–1 victory over Swedish side AIK on 22 November, sending Napoli through to the next round of the Europa League. Cavani was the last player ever to score on the Råsunda Stadium which was the stadium that hosted the 1958 FIFA World Cup final. On 6 January 2013, Cavani netted a perfect hat-trick as Napoli thumped Roma 4–1, gaining ground in the race for the league title as champions Juventus fell to a shock win. Cavani finished the season as leading Serie A goalscorer, with 29 goals, six ahead of Udinese striker Antonio Di Natale in second.

Towards the end of the season, reports emerged that Cavani would leave Napoli, with Chelsea, Manchester City, Paris Saint-Germain and Real Madrid all believed to be interested. On 27 May 2013, however, he told that he was not thinking of moving, saying, "Real Madrid, Chelsea and [Manchester] City are interested in me? I just think about Napoli." Nonetheless, he continued, "If an important offer were to come in, I will talk with president [Aurelio] De Laurentiis." He then paid tribute to his time in Italy, saying, "I'm fine in Italy, I have grown as a man there and as a player with the Serie A experience." Cavani was asked about the interest Chelsea and Manchester City took in him, saying, "I don't know if they made an offer for me, I just know that to be coached by someone like [Man City manager] Manuel Pellegrini or [Chelsea manager] José Mourinho would always be a pleasure." On 23 June, Napoli club president Aurelio De Laurentiis revealed that Cavani's reported £53 million "buyout clause expires" on 10 August 2013.

Paris Saint-Germain 

On 16 July 2013, Cavani joined French champions Paris Saint-Germain on a five-year contract, for a fee believed to be around €64 million, making it the sixth largest transfer in history, at the time. The reported sum made Cavani the record signing in French football, breaking Radamel Falcao's €60 million move to Monaco earlier in the summer, and saw him link up with former Napoli teammate Ezequiel Lavezzi in Paris.

2013–14: Debut season
Cavani debuted for PSG on 9 August, coming on as 72nd-minute substitute for Lavezzi in a league match against Montpellier. He started the following game on 18 August and scored his first goal for the club, a late equaliser against Ajaccio.

Cavani scored his first Champions League goal for the club in their European season opener against Olympiacos on 17 September. He ended the group stage with four goals from five matches as PSG qualified with a 100% win record.

On 22 January 2014, Cavani scored his 20th goal of the season in PSG's 2–1 Coupe de France defeat at home to Montpellier. On 2 March, after missing a month of the season with a thigh injury, Cavani scored on his return to the team in a 2–0 win over Le Classique rivals Marseille at the Parc des Princes.

On 19 April, he scored both goals for PSG as they beat Lyon 2–1 in the 2014 Coupe de la Ligue Final. He finished his first season with 25 goals in 43 games across all competitions, including 16 in 30 league games.

2014–16: Back-to-back domestic quadruples

Cavani scored a penalty to secure a 3–1 win at Lens on 17 October 2014, and celebrated by shooting an imaginary gun. Referee Nicolas Rainville booked him for this, and sent him off for dissent after Cavani complained about it. PSG club president Nasser Al-Khelaifi said to Canal+, "Why did he get the yellow card before? He always celebrates the same way." On 5 November 2014, it took Cavani 56 seconds to score the only goal of the game against Cypriot club APOEL, a result which put PSG into the Champions League knock-out stage with two games to spare.

In January 2015, Cavani and Ezequiel Lavezzi were fined and suspended for two matches by PSG manager Laurent Blanc for missing a mid-season training camp in Morocco and the first training session after the winter break. On 11 April, he scored two goals as a second-half substitute for Lavezzi as PSG defeated Bastia 4–0 to win the 2015 Coupe de la Ligue Final. On 8 May, he scored a hat-trick in a 6–0 defeat of Guingamp, which gave PSG a six-point lead in Ligue 1 with two matches remaining. With the title retained, PSG sealed a domestic treble on 30 May when Cavani headed the only goal of the game – his 31st in all competitions that season – to defeat Auxerre in the Coupe de France final.

Cavani and PSG kicked off the season against Lyon for the 2015 Trophée des Champions on 1 August, with him scoring the second goal of a 2–0 victory. On 21 May 2016, Cavani scored the decisive third goal of PSG's 4–2 2016 Coupe de France Final win over Marseille to record a second consecutive Ligue 1–Coupe de France–Coupe de la Ligue domestic treble for the club.

2016–18: Ligue 1 Player of the Year, back-to-back Golden Boots
On 13 September 2016, in the opening 2016–17 Champions League Group A match against Arsenal at the Parc des Princes, Cavani scored after just 44 seconds had elapsed in the first half by heading in Serge Aurier's cross from the right for PSG's fastest-ever Champions League goal. The match ended in a 1–1 draw. On 16 September, Cavani scored four times (his first ever four-goal haul with PSG) in the first half as PSG trounced Caen 6–0 away in a Ligue 1 match to end PSG's streak of three competitive matches without victory, two of them in Ligue 1. On 30 November, he scored a penalty in a 2–0 home win against Angers to take his Ligue 1 tally to 14 goals in 14 matches, which also saw him become only the fourth player in PSG history to score 100 competitive goals for the club.

Cavani scored one goal in each leg of PSG's 6–5 aggregate loss to FC Barcelona in their UEFA Champions League round of 16 tie, taking him to eight goals from eight matches in the season's competition. On 1 April 2017, he scored two-second-half goals in PSG's 4–1 win over Monaco in the 2017 Coupe de la Ligue Final. On 15 May 2017, he was named Ligue 1 Player of the Year for scoring 35 goals.

Prior to the 2017–18 season, Cavani was joined at the club by Brazilian forward Neymar, who moved to PSG in a transaction worth €222 million making him the world's most expensive player, and 18-year-old French prodigy Kylian Mbappé, a loan signing with the club having an option to sign him for €180 million. Cavani, Neymar and Mbappé immediately formed a formidable attacking trio, with Cavani scoring in each of PSG's opening three games of the 2017–18 UEFA Champions League group stage, twice in the team's 5–0 win at Celtic, once in the 3–0 win at home to Bayern Munich, and once in the 4–0 win at Anderlecht.

On 22 October, Cavani scored a curling free kick off the crossbar to earn PSG a 2–2 draw in Le Classique away to Marseille. The following month, he scored twice in the return leg against Celtic in a 7–1 win. The result saw PSG break the record for the most goals scored by a club in the group stages of the Champions League, with 24. On 4 November, Cavani's goals in a 5–0 win at Angers made him only the third player to score 100 times in two of Europe's five best leagues, after Ibrahimović and Gonzalo Higuaín.

Cavani became PSG's all-time top scorer on 27 January 2018 with a goal in a 4–0 home win over Montpellier. He surpassed Zlatan Ibrahimović's record with his 157th goal in his 229th match. On 8 May 2018, he scored as PSG won 2–0 against Les Herbiers VF to clinch the 2017–18 Coupe de France.

2018–20: Final seasons in Paris
On 25 August 2018, Cavani played his first game of the season after missing PSG's first three games following his injury at the 2018 World Cup. The front three of Cavani, Neymar and Mbappé all scored in a 3–1 league win over Angers at home, with Cavani scoring the opener from Neymar's assist. On 11 November 2018, Cavani scored a hat-trick in a 4–0 win over Monaco. On 18 December, Cavani scored in PSG's 2–1 win over Orléans in the Coupe de La Ligue; this was his 15th goal all-time in the competition, tying Pauleta's record for most goals in the tournament.

In April 2020, PSG were assigned the 2019–20 Ligue 1 title after the season was ended prematurely due to the outbreak of the COVID-19 pandemic; at the time of the League's suspension, PSG were in first place, with a twelve–point lead over second-placed Marseille. On 13 June, PSG's sporting director Leonardo revealed that Cavani would be leaving the club at the end of the Champions League campaign in August, alongside his teammate Thiago Silva.

Manchester United

2020–21: Debut season and Europa League runner-up 
On 5 October 2020, Cavani joined Premier League club Manchester United on a one-year deal with an option to extend for a further year. He was given the prestigious number 7 shirt. On 24 October 2020, he made his Premier League debut from the bench in a 0–0 draw against Chelsea. On 7 November, Cavani scored his first goal in the Premier League in a 3–1 away win against Everton. On 29 November, Cavani scored twice, including the winning goal in added time, in a 3–2 comeback win against Southampton after coming on as a half time substitute.On 2 February 2021, he scored the fourth goal in United's Premier League record-equalling 9–0 win against Southampton. On 29 April, he scored twice and assisted two more goals in a 6–2 home win over Roma in the first leg of the Europa League semi-finals; he scored another two in a 3–2 defeat in the return leg, which allowed United to advance to the final 8–5 on aggregate. Across April, Cavani scored five goals and collected three man of the match award from four starts which lead to him winning his first Manchester United player of the month award.

On 10 May 2021, Cavani officially extended his stay for another season. On 18 May, in an eventual 1–1 home draw against Fulham, Cavani scored the first goal at Old Trafford with fans in attendance since the start of the COVID-19 pandemic, a 40-yard lob. He was later awarded Premier League Goal of the Month for his effort. On 26 May, he scored the equalising goal in a 1–1 draw against Villarreal in the Europa League Final; however, Manchester United lost eventually on penalties, despite Cavani netting his spot kick in the shoot-out.

2021–22: Final season in England 
Even though Cavani played his first match of the 2021–22 season against Wolverhampton Wanderers in the number 7 shirt, upon the arrival of Cristiano Ronaldo, he agreed to switch to the number 21 shirt, the same number he wears for the Uruguay national team. He scored his first goal of the season, in a 3–0 away win on 30 October against Tottenham Hotspur, assisted by Cristiano Ronaldo.

On 22 May 2022, interim-manager Ralf Rangnick announced that Cavani would be leaving the club when his contract expired at the end of season.

Valencia
On 29 August 2022, Valencia announced the signing of Cavani with a two-year contract.

He made his mark in Spain against Elche CF on October 15, where he scored twice and got the Man of the match-award.

International career

Youth

In January 2007, Cavani was selected to join the Uruguay national under-20 team to play in the 2007 South American Youth Championship in Paraguay. He finished the tournament as top scorer with seven goals in nine games, helping Uruguay to finish in third place, thereby earning them a place in the 2007 FIFA U-20 World Cup.

Senior

2010 World Cup and 2011 Copa América

On 6 February 2008, Cavani made his first senior appearance for the Uruguayan senior team, scoring in a 2–2 draw with Colombia. He scored from his own area on the counterattack from a corner.

On 22 June 2010, in the final match of the group stage of the 2010 World Cup, Cavani set-up a goal for Luis Suárez in a 1–0 win over Mexico. Uruguay won Group A and advanced to the knockout stage. On 10 July 2010, he scored against Germany in the third place match to make the score 1–1; Germany went on to win 3–2.

On 8 October 2010, he scored his first international hat-trick in a friendly match against Indonesia, a 7–1 win in Jakarta in which Luis Suárez also scored a hat-trick.

Cavani was included in the Uruguayan squad at the 2011 Copa América in Argentina. He started the first two group games, but a knee injury in the second game against Chile ruled him out until the final. In the final, he replaced Álvaro Pereira after 63 minutes, and was involved in his team's final goal as Uruguay beat Paraguay 3–0 won a record 15th title.

2012 Olympics, 2013 Confederations Cup, and 2014 World Cup

Cavani was one of the three over-age players selected by Uruguay for the 2012 Summer Olympics.

At the 2013 FIFA Confederations Cup, Cavani equalised in the semi-final against the hosts and eventual champions Brazil, who eventually won 2–1. In the match for third place, he equalised twice against Italy, his second goal coming from a free kick, taking the game to penalties. Although Cavani scored his spot kick, Uruguay lost; he was named man of the match for his performance.

On 13 November 2013, Cavani scored the last goal in Uruguay's 5–0 away win over Jordan in a play-off for the 2014 World Cup. In their first group game of the finals, against Costa Rica in Fortaleza, Cavani opened the scoring with a penalty after Diego Lugano had been pulled down. Uruguay, however, eventually lost 3–1. Uruguay were eliminated by Colombia, following a 2–0 defeat in the round of 16 on 28 June 2014.

Post-World Cup
With Suárez suspended for the entire tournament, Cavani was an undisputed starter for Uruguay at the 2015 Copa América in Chile. In the quarter-finals against the hosts at the Estadio Nacional, Cavani was sent off for two bookings: the first for a foul on Arturo Vidal, the second for flicking at Gonzalo Jara's face after Jara had poked him in the buttocks. The incident received almost immediate and prominent international coverage from newspapers and the internet, mostly in defence of Cavani. Massive coverage included articles, columns, blogs, memes and cartoons. Press in Australia drew comparisons to what the press referred to as "Hopoate", comparing it to a similar infamous onfield anus-poking incident from rugby. Other massive international coverage of the incident came from China, the United Kingdom, France, and the United States. Internet coverage included Goal.com, Business Insider, ESPNFC, Bleacher Report The World Game, The Huffington Post, and Dirty Tackle. Teammate Jorge Fucile was later also dismissed, and holders Uruguay were eliminated with a 1–0 defeat. Cavani also took part in the Copa América Centenario the following year, but he once again went scoreless in the competition, as Uruguay were eliminated in the first round.

In 2018, Uruguay participated in the China Cup. Cavani led Uruguay to the trophy by scoring the only goal in the final match against Wales.

2018 World Cup

Cavani finished as the top scorer in the CONMEBOL 2018 FIFA World Cup qualification, with 10 goals. In March 2018, Cavani was part of the Uruguay squad that won the China Cup. He scored in the 2–0 semi-final win over the Czech Republic, and in the final he scored the only goal against Wales, his 100th cap.

In his nation's final group game of the 2018 FIFA World Cup on 25 June, Cavani scored Uruguay's final goal in a 3–0 win over hosts Russia. Cavani then went on to score both of Uruguay's goals against Portugal in a 2–1 victory in the Round of 16 on 30 June, though he was withdrawn in the second-half with an apparent hamstring injury. Because of his injury, he was ruled out of Uruguay's 2–0 defeat to France in the quarter-finals on 6 July.

2019 Copa América
In March 2019, manager Óscar Tabárez included Cavani in the final 23-man Uruguay squad for the 2019 Copa América in Brazil. On 16 June, Cavani scored "an acrobatic bicycle-kick" in a 4–0 win over Ecuador in the team's opening group match of the tournament; this was his first goal ever in the Copa América. In the quarter-finals against Peru on 29 June, he had a goal disallowed by VAR for offside in regulation time; following a 0–0 draw, the match went to a penalty shoot-out. Although Cavani was able to convert his spot-kick, Peru won the shoot-out 5–4, which saw Uruguay eliminated from the competition.

Style of play

A quick, strong, opportunistic and prolific forward with good technique, and a tall, slender frame, Cavani is considered to be one of the greatest strikers of his generation, and has been described as a "modern striker." Possessing an excellent first touch, intelligent movement off the ball, and clinical finishing, he is a well-rounded striker, who is known for his ability to score impressive goals, both with his head and with his feet, and for his tireless work-rate and energy across the pitch, as well as his willingness to track back and help his team defensively; moreover, he is an athletic player, who is also strong in the air, and who has a penchant for scoring from acrobatic goals. He is also an accurate set-piece taker, and is generally a competent penalty taker, even though his record from the spot has been inconsistent at times throughout his career.

In addition to his goalscoring, he is also known for his ability to create space for his teammates. However, despite being a prolific player, and having a reputation as one of the best strikers of his generation, he has been accused at times in the media of missing an excessive number of chances, and has also been criticised on occasion for his performances in important matches. Although he primarily plays either as a centre forward or as a main striker, he is capable of playing in several offensive positions, and has also been deployed as a supporting striker or as a winger. Writing for The Guardian in 2018, Jorge Valdano remarked upon "the generous endeavour of Cavani, a striker who covers the entire pitch". Due to his composure in front of goal, Cavani was given the nickname "El Matador" ('The Bullfighter', in Spanish) during his time in Italy. Despite his ability, he has struggled with injuries throughout his career.

Like his idol, Argentine striker Gabriel Batisuta, Cavani often celebrates scoring a goal by pretending to fire an imaginary machine gun.

Personal life
Cavani was born in Salto, Uruguay on 14 February 1987 to Luis Cavani and Berta Gómez. His elder brothers, striker Walter Guglielmone and Christian Cavani, are also professional footballers. Cavani holds an Italian passport as a result of playing in Italy and his Italian heritage; Cavani's paternal grandparents were originally from Maranello, which later became the hometown of car maker Ferrari. In 1929, they migrated to Argentina and later to Montevideo. Cavani is trilingual; he is fluent in Spanish, Italian and French.

Cavani was married to Maria Soledad Cabris Yarrús, with whom he has two sons, Bautista (born 22 March 2011) and Lucas (born 8 March 2013). In 2013, Cavani announced that he and his wife were to get a divorce, following a split between the two the year before. Then he had a daughter, India (born 17 May 2019), with his girlfriend Jocelyn Burgardt.

He is a devout Evangelical Christian. As a child, Cavani idolised Argentine striker Gabriel Batistuta. Cavani also enjoys ballet dancing. His resemblance with the cartoon character Tarzan is a popular reference among football fans.

Career statistics

Club

Notes

International

Scores and results list Uruguay's goal tally first, score column indicates score after each Cavani goal.

Honours

Danubio
Primera División: 2006–07

Napoli
Coppa Italia: 2011–12

Paris Saint-Germain
Ligue 1: 2013–14, 2014–15, 2015–16, 2017–18, 2018–19, 2019–20
Coupe de France: 2014–15, 2015–16, 2016–17, 2017–18, 2019–20
Coupe de la Ligue: 2013–14, 2014–15, 2015–16, 2016–17, 2017–18, 2019–20
Trophée des Champions: 2014, 2015, 2017, 2019
UEFA Champions League runner-up: 2019–20

Manchester United
UEFA Europa League runner-up: 2020–21

Uruguay
Copa América: 2011

Individual
 South American Youth Championship top scorer: 2007 (7 goals)
 Serie A Fan Award: 2010
 Serie A Team of the Year: 2010–11, 2011–12, 2012–13
 Coppa Italia top scorer: 2011–12 (5 goals)
 Capocannoniere: 2012–13
 Guerin d'Oro: 2012–13
 UNFP Ligue 1 Team of the Year: 2013–14, 2016–17, 2017–18
 UNFP Ligue 1 Player of the Year: 2016–17
 Ligue 1 top scorer: 2016–17 (35 goals), 2017–18 (28 goals)
 Coupe de la Ligue top scorer: 2013–14 (four goals), 2014–15 (three goals), 2016–17 (four goals)
 Coupe de France top scorer: 2014–15 (four goals)
 UNFP Ligue 1 Player of the Month: September 2016, October 2016
 ESM Team of the Year: 2016–17
 CONMEBOL FIFA World Cup qualification top scorer: 2018 (ten goals)
 Ligue 1 Best Foreign Player: 2017
 Golden Foot: 2018
 Premier League Goal of the Month: May 2021
 UEFA Europa League Squad of the Season: 2020–21

See also
List of men's footballers with 100 or more international caps
List of men's footballers with 50 or more international goals

References

External links

 Edinson Cavani – Official website
 Edinson Cavani – Valencia CF official profile
 
 
 
 
 
 

1987 births
Living people
Footballers from Salto, Uruguay
Uruguayan people of Italian descent
Uruguayan evangelicals
Uruguayan footballers
Association football forwards
Danubio F.C. players
Palermo F.C. players
S.S.C. Napoli players
Paris Saint-Germain F.C. players
Manchester United F.C. players
Valencia CF players
Uruguayan Primera División players
Serie A players
Ligue 1 players
Premier League players

Uruguay youth international footballers
Uruguay under-20 international footballers
Olympic footballers of Uruguay
Uruguay international footballers
2010 FIFA World Cup players
2011 Copa América players
Footballers at the 2012 Summer Olympics
2013 FIFA Confederations Cup players
2014 FIFA World Cup players
2015 Copa América players
Copa América Centenario players
2018 FIFA World Cup players
2019 Copa América players
2021 Copa América players
2022 FIFA World Cup players
Copa América-winning players
FIFA Century Club
Uruguayan expatriate footballers
Uruguayan expatriate sportspeople in Italy
Uruguayan expatriate sportspeople in France
Uruguayan expatriate sportspeople in England
Uruguayan expatriate sportspeople in Spain
Expatriate footballers in Italy
Expatriate footballers in France
Expatriate footballers in England
Expatriate footballers in Spain
Race-related controversies in the United Kingdom